Sergey Viktorovich Kolyaskin (Russian: Сергей Викторович Коляскин; born 10 February 1949) is a Soviet rower. He competed at the 1972 Summer Olympics in Munich with the men's eight where they came fourth.

References

1949 births
Living people
Soviet male rowers
Olympic rowers of the Soviet Union
Rowers at the 1972 Summer Olympics
European Rowing Championships medalists